Novy Dvor it the name of several localities in Belarus (Новы Двор) and Russia (Новый Двор). The word literally means "new yard", "new manor".

Brest Oblast

Grodno Oblast

Minsk Oblast

Vitebsk Oblast

Новы Двор (Верхнядзвінскі раён)
Новы Двор (Мёрскі раён)
Новы Двор (Пастаўскі раён)

See also
Nowy Dwór (disambiguation), same name, Poland
Nový Dvůr (disambiguation), Czech republic

Populated places in Belarus